The following features lists of the film and television performances of actress and singer Irene Dunne (1898–1990), who appeared in 42 movies between 1930 and 1952 and was nominated for the Academy Award for Best Actress five times. She is best known for appearing in the screwball comedy films The Awful Truth, Theodora Goes Wild and My Favorite Wife, as well as the romantic drama Love Affair.

Filmography

Appearing as herself

Radio appearances

Television credits

References

Footnotes

Citations

Literature cited

External links 
 
 

Actress filmographies
American filmographies
Credits